Ferenc Kardos (4 December 1937 – 6 March 1999) was a Hungarian film director, producer and screenwriter. He directed 23 films between 1959 and 1997. His 1973 film, Petőfi '73, was entered into the 1973 Cannes Film Festival.

Selected filmography
 Petőfi '73 (1973)
 Foetus (1994)
 The Witman Boys (1997)

References

External links

1937 births
1999 deaths
Hungarian film directors
Hungarian film producers
Male screenwriters
Hungarian male writers
20th-century Hungarian screenwriters